The 1933 All-SEC football team consists of American football players selected to the All-Southeastern Conference (SEC) chosen by various selectors for the 1933 college football season. This was the inaugural SEC season; the All-SEC teams now taking precedence over the All-Southern team. The Associated Press (AP) All-SEC teams are the only ones which become a part of official conference records. The Alabama Crimson Tide won the conference, the only blemish on its conference record a scoreless tie with the Ole Miss Rebels. Tennessee halfback Beattie Feathers was voted SEC Player of the Year.

All-SEC selections

Ends
David Ariail, Auburn (AP-1, UP-1)
Graham Batchelor, Georgia (AP-1, UP-1)
J. R. Slocum, Georgia Tech (AP-2, UP-2)
Joe Rupert, Kentucky (AP-2, UP-2)
Don Hutson, Alabama (College Football Hall of Fame) (AP-3)
Bart Herrington, Ole Miss (AP-3)

Tackles
Jack Torrance, LSU (AP-1, UP-1)
B. W. Williams, Georgia Tech (AP-3, UP-1)
Bob Tharpe, Georgia Tech (AP-1)
Bill Lee, Alabama (AP-2, UP-2)
Hal Starbuck, Florida (AP-2)
F. G. McCollum, Auburn (UP-2)
Jesse Flowers, Ole Miss (AP-3)

Guards
Leroy Moorehead, Georgia (AP-1, UP-1)
Thomas Hupke, Alabama (AP-1, UP-1)
J. B. Ellis, Tennessee (AP-2, UP-2)
W. H. Chambliss, Auburn (AP-2, UP-2)
Bowe, Vanderbilt (AP-3)
D. Wilcox, Georgia Tech (AP-3)

Centers
Talmadge Maples, Tennessee (AP-1, UP-1)
Homer Robinson, Tulane (AP-2, UP-2)
Welcome Shearer, Florida (AP-3)

Quarterbacks
Ripper Williams, Auburn (AP-1, UP-1)
Rand Dixon, Vanderbilt (AP-2)
Byron Griffith, Georgia (UP-2)

Halfbacks
Beattie Feathers, Tennessee (College Football Hall of Fame) (AP-1, UP-1)
Joseph Grant, Georgia (AP-2, UP-1)
Dixie Howell, Alabama (College Football Hall of Fame) (AP-1)
Floyd Roberts, Tulane (AP-2)
Abe Mickal, LSU (College Football Hall of Fame) (UP-2)
Casy Kimbrell, Auburn (AP-3)
Homer Key, Georgia (AP-3)
Bob Herrington, Miss. St. (AP-3)
George Chapman, Georgia (AP-3)

Fullbacks
Ralph Kercheval, Kentucky (AP-1, UP-2 [as hb])
D. J. Phillips, Georgia Tech (AP-2, UP-2)

Key

AP = Associated Press.

UP = United Press

Bold = Consensus first-team selection by both AP and UP

See also
1933 College Football All-America Team

References

All-SEC
All-SEC football teams